FC Uralets Nizhny Tagil was a Russian football team from Nizhny Tagil. It played professionally from 1946 to 1949 and 1958 to 2006. The highest level it ever achieved was the second-highest (Soviet First League and Russian First Division), where it played in 1947–1949, 1958–1962 and 1992–1993. The team was called Dzerzhinets Nizhny Tagil (1946–1957) and Metallurg Nizhny Tagil (1958–1961)

External links
  Team history at KLISF

Association football clubs established in 1946
Association football clubs disestablished in 2006
Defunct football clubs in Russia
Sport in Sverdlovsk Oblast
1946 establishments in Russia
2006 disestablishments in Russia
Nizhny Tagil